Mitchell Park is a  park in West Haven-Sylvan, Oregon. Features include basketball and tennis courts, baseball and soccer fields, and a playground.

References

Parks in Washington County, Oregon